Hamnam Line may refer to:

Hamnam Line (Chōtetsu)
former name of Kŭmgol Line
former name of Sinhŭng Line (Hamhung to Yŏnggwang)